Borderless World Foundation (BWF) is a non-profit, non-governmental organization registered under India's Societies Registration Act, 1860. Working in Jammu and Kashmir, along the conflict-riven border region in between India, Pakistan & China, BWF has rescued hundreds of girls orphaned in the conflict along the India-Pakistan border. BWF strives toward a vision of "One Great Human Family" through a variety of activities, including disaster relief and emergency medical support for the community and rescuing hundreds of children left orphaned by the ongoing conflict and providing love, support, health care and education to help them grow into a generation of peacemakers.

History and Mission 
BWF was founded in 2002 by Adhik Kadam and  Bharati Mamani in Pune, India. The mission of BWF is to provide ‘Human Touch' to the people of border areas who lost their loved ones in violence and armed conflict in the Kashmir conflict. BWF is on a mission to making peace and spreading love through their various programs. Founders of BWF started working in Kashmir in the year 1997.

Programs 
BWF works in education , health care, emergency medicine, and women's empowerment. The organization runs four homes for girls who have lost their parents in the armed conflict in Kashmir Valley, during Kargil War and 2005 Kashmir earthquake. BWF support girls' education, vocational training and mentoring for the purposeful life.

 Basera E Tabassum (BeT): A home for orphan girls started in District Kupwara, Srinagar, Anantnag, Budgam and Jammu with the help of the Silicon Valley chapter of Asha for Education.
 Kashmir Life Line (KLL): First critical care Emergency Medical Services started by BWF in Kashmir in partnership with National Securities Depository Limited (NSDL),  DP World and Jammu & Kashmir health department. Through this program, BWF provided the first four ambulances for the public to the region.
 Rah-e-Niswan: Rah-e-Niswan helps the girls growing up in the BWF homes learn entrepreneurial skills and financial management. Established as the first ‘ladies-only’ business in the area and run by the young women of the BWF, it provides women in the larger  community a safe and hesitation-free environment to shop for their requirements such as sanitary napkins.
 Surgeries of Pellet Victims: Following an upsurge of violence in 2016, BWF organized free surgeries for those at risk of losing their eyesight because of  pellet gun injuries. BWF partnered with Aditya Jyot Eye Hospital, Sankara Eye Foundation in this effort. Conducted by leading surgeons from India, these operations saved the sight of hundreds of victims.
 Disaster relief: The BWF team has been a first responder in wake of many natural disasters, including the floods in 2014. BWF was able to recruit doctors and donations of medical supplies, including fully equipped ambulances, from across India to help the people in Kashmir.

Awards and recognition 

In 2010, BWF was presented the Harmony Foundation's "Mother Teresa Award" in the field of Social Justice and Peace by the Dalai Lama. Adhik Kadam and BWF were recognized in 2016 for their work by Indians for Collective Action.

References

External links 
 Official website

Organizations established in 2002
Organisations based in Jammu and Kashmir
Organisations based in Maharashtra
Children's charities based in India
Peacebuilding in Jammu and Kashmir
2002 establishments in Maharashtra